In the Stanser Verkommnis of 1481 the Tagsatzung solved the latent conflict between the rural and urban cantons of the Old Swiss Confederacy, averting the breaking of the Confederacy, and triggering its further expansion from 8 to 13 members until 1513.

The tensions between the cantons had arisen in the wake of the Burgundy Wars, among other things due to disagreement over the distribution of spoils which culminated in the Saubannerzug.

According to Diebold Schilling the Younger, who was present at the session of the Tagsatzung, the conflict was resolved as on 22 December the pastor of Stans, Heini Amgrund, brought a message from the hermit Niklaus von Flüe. Upon reception of the message, the quarrels were laid aside. The content of the message is unknown.

The compromise solution entailed the accession of Fribourg and Solothurn as full members of the Confederacy.

References

15th century in the Old Swiss Confederacy
Stans